Johan Collett Falsen (9 September 1817 – 2 September 1879) was a Norwegian jurist and politician.

John Collett Falsen born in the town of Grimstad in Nedenes amt in southern Norway.  He was the son of Hagbart Falsen and wife Aletta Fleischer. He was the grandson of Enevold de Falsen (1755–1808) as well as being  the nephew of admiral Jørgen Conrad de Falsen (1785–1849), statesman Christian Magnus Falsen  (1782–1830) and  county governor Carl Valentin de Falsen (1787–1852).

Falsen  attended Bergen Cathedral School (1828). He graduated as cand.jur. from the University of Christiania in 1841. He worked as an attorney (prokurator) in Nedenes from 1846, and then in Trondhjem. In 1849 he moved to Drammen to work as an attorney there. He became involved in politics, serving as mayor of Drammen from 1853 to 1859 and in 1861. He was first elected to the Norwegian Parliament in 1859, representing the urban constituency of Drammen.

In 1861 he was appointed County Governors of Nordre Bergenhus amt (now Sogn og Fjordane). He first resided at Lærdalsøyri, but bought a farm in Leikanger in 1862. He thus became the first County Governor to live in Leikanger, where the county administration is located today. While stationed here, he was elected to Parliament for two more terms; in 1865 and 1868. He left the County Governor position in 1869 to pursue a career in national politics.

In February 1870 Falsen was appointed Minister of Justice and the Police. His tenure ended on 29 June the same year; two days later he was appointed to the Council of State Division in Stockholm. On 1 August 1871 he was reassigned again, this time as Minister of the Navy and Postal Affairs. Only two months later, on 1 October, he was appointed Minister of Justice again.

He held this post until 1 September 1872, when he was appointed Minister of the Interior. He held this position for exactly one year; then he returned to the Council of State Division in Stockholm. Exactly one year after that, he was appointed to his third period as Minister of Justice. He held this post until his death in September 1879, except for a period between 1 August 1877 and 1 August 1878, when he was assigned to the Council of State Division in Stockholm.

Falsen was appointed a Commander of the Order of St. Olav, a Grand Cross of the Swedish Order of the Polar Star and a Grand Cross of the Danish Order of the Dannebrog.

References

1817 births
1879 deaths
People from Aust-Agder
People educated at the Bergen Cathedral School
University of Oslo alumni
Government ministers of Norway
Members of the Storting
County governors of Norway
Mayors of places in Buskerud
Politicians from Drammen
Sogn og Fjordane politicians
Recipients of the St. Olav's Medal
Grand Crosses of the Order of the Dannebrog
Commanders Grand Cross of the Order of the Polar Star
Ministers of Justice of Norway